Mohammad Nadeem Ghauri (born 12 October 1962) is a former Pakistani cricketer who played in one Test matches and six One Day Internationals (ODI) in 1990.

Playing career
Ghauri was born in Lahore, Punjab, Pakistan. Ghouri's only Test match appearance came against Australia in 1990. He had the unfortunate record of scoring neither a run nor taking a wicket in his Test career.

Umpiring career
In 2005, Nadeem Ghauri officiated in his first Test as umpire, making his debut at Dhaka in a Test between Bangladesh and Zimbabwe. Five years earlier, he made his debut as a One Day International umpire in his hometown in match played between Pakistan and Sri Lanka. Nadeem Ghauri has officiated in five Tests, 43 ODIs and four T20Is.

In 2009, while Ghouri was traveling with the Sri Lankan cricket team to Gaddafi cricket stadium, the bus in which they were riding was attacked by terrorists. Ghouri was not injured.

In April 2013 Nadeem Ghauri was suspended from umpiring for four years by the Pakistan Cricket Board, after being guilty of being willing to accept money for favourable umpiring decisions.  In December 2014, he asked the PCB to reconsider his ban.

References

External links
 

1962 births
Living people
Pakistan Test cricketers
Pakistan One Day International cricketers
Habib Bank Limited cricketers
Pakistani Test cricket umpires
Pakistani One Day International cricket umpires
Pakistani Twenty20 International cricket umpires
Pakistani cricketers
Cricketers from Lahore
Lahore City cricketers
Lahore City Whites cricketers
Service Industries cricketers
Pakistan Railways cricketers
Pakistan Starlets cricketers